Antonio Juantegui (4 April 1898 – 13 May 1966) was a Spanish footballer. He played in one match for the Spain national football team in 1924.

References

External links
 

1898 births
1966 deaths
Spanish footballers
Spain international footballers
Sportspeople from Gipuzkoa
Association football midfielders
Real Sociedad footballers
RCD Espanyol footballers
Footballers at the 1924 Summer Olympics
Olympic footballers of Spain
People from Goierri
Footballers from the Basque Country (autonomous community)